Leptaxis vetusa is a species of air-breathing land snail, a terrestrial pulmonate gastropod mollusk in the family Helicidae, the typical snails.

This species is endemic to the Azores, Portugal. It was assessed as Critically Endangered in 1996 but is now thought to be extinct. Besides its shell, its anatomy is unknown. The species type locality is the south and southeast slopes of Pico do Facho, Santa Maria Island.

References

Endemic fauna of the Azores
Molluscs of Europe
Leptaxis
Gastropods described in 1857
Taxonomy articles created by Polbot